Marxism and Freedom: from 1776 Until Today is a 1958 book by the philosopher and activist Raya Dunayevskaya, the first volume of her 'Trilogy of Revolution'.

Published in 1958, this is the first expression in book form of Raya Dunayevskaya's Marxist humanism. A central theme of Marxism and Freedom is Dunayevskaya's assertion that the "movement from  practice is itself a form of theory". This concept was developed by Dunayevskaya from a direct encounter with Hegel's dialectical philosophy and  particularly his Absolutes, which she interpreted as posing a dual movement from practice to theory, and from theory to practice. Blacks, workers, women, and youth struggling for freedom were not faceless masses to be led, she held, but the source of new stages of cognition because in their very actions was embedded a theory of human liberation. One example of this is the West Virginia Miners General Strike of 1949–1950, where Dunayevskaya pointed out that instead of merely demanding higher wages, the workers were asking questions such as, "What kind of labor should man do?" and "Why should there be such a gulf between thinking and doing?" She based the book's structure on her view that history and theory emanate from the movement from practice.

The book aimed to "establish the theory of Marxism on native grounds". The Montgomery bus boycott, the abolitionist movement, the American Civil War, and the fight for the eight-hour day by American workers were seen by her as revolutionary American struggles which provided fertile ground for the humanism of Karl Marx. Dunayevskaya analyzed the latter struggles as making "historic contributions" to Marx's thinking, especially in the structure and content of his major theoretical work Capital. The new stage of automation in production – whether in the mines with the "continuous miner" (a machine the miners called a "mankiller") or in the auto shops – with its consequent speed-up, was also seen by Dunayevskaya as a new stage in American worker revolt.

The 1958 edition of Marxism and Freedom contained the first published English translations of Karl Marx's Economic and Philosophic Manuscripts of 1844 and of Vladimir Lenin's notebooks on Hegel's Science of Logic. She felt a false division had been made between the "young Marx" of 1844, and the "mature Marx" of Capital. Rather, she saw Marx's complete body of work as a development of 1844, where he broke with bourgeois society and labeled his own thought "a thoroughgoing Naturalism, or Humanism."

Among those who argued for separating Marx into two distinct thinkers – one young and idealistic and the other mature and scientific – were  Soviet theoreticians. Dunayevskaya believed the Communist state turned Marxism into its opposite – the totalitarian theory and practice of the Stalinist and post-Stalin USSR – and signaled a new stage of world "state-capitalism". Marxism and Freedom presented an analysis of the USSR's economy as state-capitalist – rather than socialist, bureaucratic collectivist, or a "degenerated workers' state" – based on Marx's economic categories and official Soviet statistics. She pointed to the Uprising of 1953 in East Germany and the 1956 Hungarian Revolution as more than revolts against Communism, because they based themselves on Marx's Humanism.  Later editions added critical analyses of Mao Zedong and his Cultural Revolution.

Marxist intellectual and Frankfurt School thinker Herbert Marcuse wrote the preface to the first edition of Marxism and Freedom, and Scottish socialist Harry McShane wrote a preface to the British edition. The 2000 edition featured a new foreword by US Green Party activist and social theorist Joel Kovel.

References

1958 non-fiction books
Political books
Communist books
Books about Marxism